Hits of the 50's is the fifth studio album by American singer-songwriter Sam Cooke. Produced by Hugo & Luigi, the album was released in August 1960 by RCA Victor. Hits of the 50's consists of Cooke's versions of songs originally sung by such artists as Nat King Cole, Frankie Avalon, and Doris Day.

The album was remastered in 2011 as a part of The RCA Albums Collection.

Background
Hits of the 50's was recorded only two weeks following the sessions that produced Cooke's Tour in March 1960, over a month prior to the release of that album. The bulk of the album was recorded on March 23, 1960, with the remaining numbers—"The Great Pretender", "You, You, You", "The Wayward Wind", "Cry", and "Venus"—being recorded the following day. Many of the same musicians who recorded on Cooke's Tour returned for Hits of the 50's.

Track listing
All songs arranged and conducted by Glen Osser.

Side one 
 "Hey There" (Richard Adler, Jerry Ross) – 2:32
 "Mona Lisa" (Ray Evans, Jay Livingston) – 2:34
 "Too Young" (Sidney Lippman, Sylvia Dee) – 2:08
 "The Great Pretender" (Buck Ram) – 3:02
 "You, You, You" (Olias Lotar, Robert Mellin) – 2:45
 "Unchained Melody" (Alex North, Hy Zaret) – 3:24

Side two
 "The Wayward Wind" (Stanley Lebowsky, Herbert Newman) – 3:10
 "Secret Love" (Sammy Fain, Paul Francis Webster) – 2:46
 "The Song from Moulin Rouge" (Georges Auric, William Engvick) – 2:30
 "I'm Walking Behind You" (Billy Reid) – 2:45
 "Cry" (Churchill Kohlman) – 2:13
 "Venus" (Ed Marshall, Peter DeAngelis) – 2:53

Personnel
All credits adapted from The RCA Albums Collection (2011) liner notes.
Sam Cooke – vocals
Al Casamenti, Barry Galbraith, Charles Macey, Clifton White, Arthur Ryerson – guitar
Lloyd Trotman – bass guitar
Bunny Shawker – drums
George Gaber – percussion
Andy Ackers – piano
James Buffington, Anthony Miranda – French horn
Julius Baker, Jerome Weiner – flute
Eddie Costa – vibraphone
Gloria Agostini, Laura Newell – harp
Glenn Osser – arrangement, conducting
Bob Simpson –  recording engineer

Notes

External links 
 Songs of Sam Cooke: Main Page

1960 albums
Sam Cooke albums
RCA Victor albums
Albums produced by Hugo & Luigi
Albums arranged by Glenn Osser
Albums conducted by Glenn Osser